National Tertiary Route 307, or just Route 307 (or ) is a National Road Route of Costa Rica, located in the San José, Heredia provinces.

Description
In San José province the route covers Vázquez de Coronado canton (San Rafael, Dulce Nombre de Jesús, Cascajal districts), Moravia canton (San Jerónimo district).

In Heredia province the route covers Santo Domingo canton (Paracito district).

References

Highways in Costa Rica